Sohana is a village located in Sahibzada Ajit Singh Nagar (Punjab). Its population is about 20,000. It is located near Sector 70, Mohali.

Distance from neighbour towns
Chandigarh - 5 km
Kharar - 12 km
Homeland Heights - 100 m
Sohana Hospital - 100 m

Temples
 Gurdwara Singh Shaheedan
 Shri Thakur Dwara Mandir (Hanuman Mandir)
 Mandir Mata Raj Rajeshwari, located near the Khadhi Bhandaar office
 Shiv Mandir
 Musjid
 Badri Narayan Mandir
 Gurdwara Akal Ashram
 Sri Guru Harkrishan Sahib (C) Hospitals
 Sohana Hospital
 Sai Mandir

Local Shops
 Co-operative Bank
 Post Office
 Fabric Shops
 Photographers
 Mobile shops
 JL Avology

Notable people
Bhadant Anand Kausalyayan was born here in 1905.
Prince Narula was also born here

References 

Villages in Sahibzada Ajit Singh Nagar district